Markku Matti Laukkanen (born 20 December 1950 in Valkeala) is a Finnish TV journalist and politician. He was a member of the Parliament of Finland from 1991 to 1995 and again from 1999 to 2011, representing the Centre Party. He is a graduate of the University of Tampere.

References

1950 births
Living people
People from Valkeala
Centre Party (Finland) politicians
Members of the Parliament of Finland (1991–95)
Members of the Parliament of Finland (1999–2003)
Members of the Parliament of Finland (2003–07)
Members of the Parliament of Finland (2007–11)